Grêmio Esportivo Olímpico, commonly known as Olímpico, was a Brazilian football club based in Blumenau, Santa Catarina state. They won the Campeonato Catarinense twice.

History
The club was founded on August 14, 1919 as Sociedade Desportiva Blumenauense. The club was renamed to Grêmio Esportivo Olímpico in 1949. They won the Campeonato Catarinense in 1949 and in 1964. The club closed its football department in 1971.

In 1980, when Blumenau's Palmeiras, founded in 1919 as Brasil and until then four times runner-up in the state championship, in attempt to broaden its appeal in the community renamed itself to Blumenau Esporte Clube it integrated the dark red (grena) colour of Olímpico in its new insignia.

Stadium
Grêmio Esportivo Olímpico played their home games at Estádio Aderbal Ramos da Silva, nicknamed Deba. The stadium had a maximum capacity of 3,500 people, and it was demolished in 2007.

Achievements

 Campeonato Catarinense:
 Winners (2): 1949, 1964

References

Defunct football clubs in Santa Catarina (state)
Association football clubs established in 1919
Blumenau
1919 establishments in Brazil
1970s disestablishments in Brazil